Route 198 is a  state highway in northeastern Connecticut and southern Massachusetts, running from Chaplin, CT to the Southbridge, MA.

Route description

Route 198 begins at an intersection with US 6 in Chaplin and heads north across the Natchaug River, then northeast parallel to the river into Eastford.  In Eastford, it continues north, crossing US 44 and meeting the west end of Route 244 (an old alignment of US 44) in the center of town.  It then enters the town of Woodstock, where it passes through the western part of town, briefly overlapping Route 171 and crossing Route 197 before continuing north to the Massachusetts state line. It continues along Eastford Road in the town of Southbridge. At the south end of the town center, Route 198 has an oblique intersection with Elm Street, and the state highway assumes that name to its northern terminus at Route 131 (Main Street) in the town center.

History

Connecticut
In the 1920s, modern Route 198 belonged to different state highways. From US 6 to US 44, it was part of old Highway 101, and from US 44 to Route 171, it was part of old Highway 183. Route 198 was commissioned in 1932, running along the current route of Route 171 from former Route 15 (now I-84) in Union to former Route 91 (now Route 171) in Woodstock. Between 1932 and 1942, its western terminus was truncated at the Union-Eastford town line. Between 1947 and 1949, it was extended back to Route 15. Between 1952 and 1954, it was extended along the current route of Route 190 to the newly opened Route 15 freeway (now I-84). On January 1, 1959, with the decommissioning of Route 91, Route 198 was extended east to US 6. In 1963, Routes 171 and 198 were rerouted, with the northern terminus of Route 198 being moved to the state line.

Major intersections

References

198
Transportation in Worcester County, Massachusetts
198
Transportation in Windham County, Connecticut